The North Carolina Army National Guard (NCARNG) is North Carolina's principal military force. The force is equipped by the federal government and jointly maintained subject to the call of either. The professional head of the North Carolina Army National Guard is the Adjutant General.

History
The North Carolina National Guard, or Carolina militia as it was originally known, was born from the Carolina Charter of 1663. The charter gave to the Proprietors the right "to Leavy Mufter and Trayne all sortes of men of what Conditon or wherefoever borne in the said Province for the tyme being".

Structure
The North Carolina Army National Guard is organized into six major commands. These units come under supervision of the Adjutant General in time of peace, and automatically become part of his command when they are first ordered into active service in the active military services of the United States in case of emergency:
  30th Armored Brigade (Old Hickory)
 Headquarters and Headquarters Company (HHC) (HQ at Clinton)
 1st Squadron, 150th Cavalry Regiment (West Virginia Army National Guard)
 Troop D in Sanford, North Carolina, remainder of 1st Squadron in West Virginia
 1st Battalion, 120th Infantry Regiment (HQ at Wilmington)
 1st Battalion, 252nd Armor Regiment (HQ at Fayetteville)
 230th Brigade Support Battalion (230th BSB) (HQ at Goldsboro)
 236th Brigade Engineer Battalion (HQ in Durham, NC)
 1st Battalion, 113th Field Artillery Regiment (1-113th FAR) (HQ at Charlotte)
4th Battalion, 118th Infantry Regiment (South Carolina Army National Guard)
  449th Combat Aviation Brigade(449th TAB)
 Headquarters and Headquarters Company
 1st Battalion (Attack Reconnaissance), 130th Aviation Regiment
 2nd Battalion (Airfield Operations), 130th Aviation Regiment
 1st Battalion, 131st Aviation Regiment
 Company C
 Detachment 17 (Joint Operational Support Airlift Center)
 2nd Battalion, 151st Aviation Regiment
 Company B
 Detachment 1
 638th Aviation Support Battalion
 Company B
 Detachment 1
 677th Engineer Detachment (FFTG)
 430th Engineer Detachment (FFTG)
  130th Maneuver Enhancement Brigade
105th Military Police Battalion (HQ at Asheville)
 105th Engineer Battalion (HQ at Raeford)
 505th Engineer Battalion (HQ at Gastonia)
 109th Military Police Battalion (HQ at Kinston)
 Headquarters Sustainment Company  (HQ at Charlotte)
 295th Signal Support Company (HQ at Mooresville)
 578th FEST (HQ at Charlotte)
 MCPOD (HQ at Charlotte)
  113th Sustainment Brigade
 113th Special Troops Battalion (HQ at Asheboro)
 630th Combat Sustainment Support Battalion (HQ at Lenoir)
  60th Troop Command
 Recruiting and Retention Command (HQ at Raleigh)
 382d Public Affairs Detachment (HQ at Raleigh)
 130th Military History Detachment (HQ at Raleigh)
 440th Army Band (HQ at Raleigh)
 Medical Detachment (HQ at Stem)
 5th Battalion, 113th Field Artillery (HQ at Louisburg)
 42d Civil Support Detachment (HQ at Greenville)
 403d Rigger Support Team
 430th Ordnance Company (EOD) (HQ at Washington)
 Company B, 3rd Battalion, 20th Special Forces Group (HQ at Roanoke Rapids)
 Company B, 1st Battalion, 20th Special Forces Group (HQ at Albemarle)
 Special Operations Detachment-X-JSOC
  139th Regiment

Regimental affiliations
Regiments of the North Carolina Army National Guard are listed in order of precedence according to the U.S. Army Regimental System -- Army National Guard where seniority does not always bring priority:

See also
 1969 Greensboro uprising
 North Carolina Air National Guard

References

Citations

Bibliography

Further reading

External links

 
Bibliography of North Carolina Army National Guard History compiled by the United States Army Center of Military History
GlobalSecurity.org North Carolina Army National Guard
Unit Designations in the Army Modular Force

1663 establishments in the British Empire
Army National Guard
Military units and formations established in 1663
Army National Guard
Army National Guard
United States Army National Guard by state